Wilsondale is an unincorporated community located in southern Wayne County, West Virginia, United States. Wilsondale has a post office with ZIP code 25699; as of the 2000 Census, the population of this ZIP Code Tabulation Area was 74. It is a part of the Huntington-Ashland, WV-KY-OH, Metropolitan Statistical Area (MSA). As of the 2000 census, the MSA had a population of 288,649.

History

Geography
Wilsondale is in the Eastern Time Zone (UTC -5 hours) and observes Daylight Saving Time.

Demographics
Wilsondale's ZCTA had a population of 74, with 41 males and 33 females, at the 2000 census. 98.6% of the population was white, while the remaining 1.4% was American Indian or Alaska Native. There were 32 households with an average household size of 2.64. The average house value was listed at $45,000, with an average household income of $21,375. The median age of the general population was 46.30 years, with the male median age at 41.80 and the female median age at 50.30.

Notable person
Blaze Starr, raised in the Newground Hollow area of Wilsondale.

References

External links
Wilsondale, WV information at zipareacode.net
Wilsondale info at hometownlocator.com

Unincorporated communities in Wayne County, West Virginia
Unincorporated communities in West Virginia